Thornville is a village in Perry County, Ohio, United States. It is 20 miles north of the county seat of New Lexington. The village had a population of 1,087 as of the 2020 census.

History
Thornville was originally called Lebanon, and under the latter name was laid out around 1811. A post office called Thornville has been in operation since 1820.

Thornville is the location of the Lost Lands music festival, hosted by Excision.

Geography
Thornville is located at  (39.896506, -82.419563).

Demographics

2020 census
As of the census of 2020, there were 1,087 people and 430 households living in the village. The census recorded 1,053 White residents, 2 African American residents, 1 Native American resident, 0 Asian residents, 3 residents of some other race, and 28 from two or more races.

2010 census
As of the census of 2010, there were 991 people, 417 households, and 277 families living in the village. The racial makeup of the village was 98.8% White, 0.1% African American, 0.1% Native American, 0.1% Asian, and 0.9% from two or more races.

There were 417 households, of which 34.3% had children under the age of 18 living with them, 48.9% were married couples living together, 11.5% had a female householder with no husband present, 6.0% had a male householder with no wife present, and 33.6% were non-families. 27.8% of all households were made up of individuals, and 12.7% had someone living alone who was 65 years of age or older. The average household size was 2.38 and the average family size was 2.87.

The median age in the village was 39.7 years. 25.1% of residents were under the age of 18; 8.1% were between the ages of 18 and 24; 24.2% were from 25 to 44; 26.9% were from 45 to 64; and 16% were 65 years of age or older. The gender makeup of the village was 47.8% male and 52.2% female.

2000 census
As of the census of 2000, there were 731 people, 282 households, and 212 families living in the village. The population density was 1,686.7 people per square mile (656.4/km). There were 298 housing units at an average density of 687.6 per square mile (267.6/km). The racial makeup of the village was 98.91% White, 0.41% Native American, and 0.68% from two or more races.

There were 282 households, out of which 35.1% had children under the age of 18 living with them, 66.0% were married couples living together, 6.4% had a female householder with no husband present, and 24.5% were non-families. 22.0% of all households were made up of individuals, and 10.3% had someone living alone who was 65 years of age or older. The average household size was 2.59 and the average family size was 3.03.

In the village, the population was spread out, with 26.0% under the age of 18, 6.3% from 18 to 24, 31.1% from 25 to 44, 23.3% from 45 to 64, and 13.4% who were 65 years of age or older. The median age was 38 years. For every 100 females there were 98.6 males. For every 100 females age 18 and over, there were 96.7 males.

The median income for a household in the village was $47,679, and the median income for a family was $51,641. Males had a median income of $34,107 versus $30,694 for females. The per capita income for the village was $18,922. About 1.8% of families and 4.2% of the population were below the poverty line, including 4.0% of those under age 18 and 6.8% of those age 65 or over.

Education
Northern Local School District operates three public schools in or near the village: Thornville Elementary School, Sheridan Middle School, and Sheridan High School. Sheridan middle and high schools are within Thornville's zip code but are physically located about six miles southeast of the village along State Route 13, halfway between Thornville and Somerset.

Thornville has a public library, a branch of the Perry County District Library.

References

External links
 Village website

Villages in Perry County, Ohio
Villages in Ohio
1811 establishments in Ohio
Populated places established in 1811